The weightlifting competition at the 1924 Summer Olympics in Paris consisted of five weight classes, all for men only.

Medal summary

Participating nations

Medal table

References

External links
 

 
1924 Summer Olympics events
1924